Pileolidae is an extinct family of fossil sea snails, marine gastropod mollusks. This family is related to the extant family Neritidae, the nerites.
The family has no subfamilies according to the taxonomy of the Gastropoda by Bouchet & Rocroi, 2005.

Genera 
The genus Pileolus  is found in Cretaceous age deposits in Europe, and Jurassic age deposits in New Zealand.

References